Molina is an unincorporated community and a U.S. Post Office located in Mesa County, Colorado, United States.  The Molina Post Office has the ZIP Code 81646.

Geography
Molina is located at  (39.188893,-108.060322).

References

Unincorporated communities in Mesa County, Colorado
Unincorporated communities in Colorado